Robert Michael James Gascoyne-Cecil, 7th Marquess of Salisbury, Baron Gascoyne-Cecil,  (born 30 September 1946), is a British Conservative politician. From 1979 to 1987 he represented South Dorset in the House of Commons, and in the 1990s he was Leader of the House of Lords under his courtesy title of Viscount Cranborne. Lord Salisbury lives in one of England's largest historic houses, the 17th-century Hatfield House in Hertfordshire, and currently serves as Chancellor of the University of Hertfordshire.

Early life
Robert Michael James Gascoyne-Cecil was born on 30 September 1946, the eldest child and first-born son of Robert Gascoyne-Cecil, 6th Marquess of Salisbury. His younger brother was the journalist Lord Richard Cecil, who was killed covering the conflict in Rhodesia in 1978.

Lord Cranborne attended Eton College and Christ Church, Oxford, and became a merchant banker before going to work on the family estates.

Political career

House of Commons
Lord Cranborne was selected as the Conservative Party candidate for South Dorset in 1976, where his family owned land, despite there being on the shortlist several former members of parliament who had lost their seats in the two 1974 elections. At the 1978 Conservative Party conference he spoke in opposition to British sanctions against Rhodesia. He won the South Dorset seat at the 1979 general election, becoming the seventh consecutive generation of his family to sit in the House of Commons. In his maiden speech, he urged Ian Smith, prime minister of Rhodesia, to stand aside in favour of Abel Muzorewa.

Cranborne gained a general reputation as a right-winger, especially on matters affecting the Church of England, but confounded this reputation when he co-wrote a pamphlet in 1981 which said that the fight against unemployment ought to be given more priority than the fight against inflation. He took an interest in Northern Ireland, and, when Jim Prior announced his policy of 'Rolling Devolution', resigned an unpaid job as assistant to Douglas Hurd.

Lord Cranborne became known in the early 1980s as an anti-communist, as a supporter of Afghan refugees (from the Soviet invasion of that country) in Pakistan, and for sending food parcels to Poland. Until the early years of the 21st century, a charity shop was run on his Hatfield House estate solely to raise money for these causes, including funds for Polish orphanages. He was involved in efforts to fund the Afghan resistance. His strong opposition to any involvement by the Republic of Ireland in Northern Ireland led him to oppose the Anglo-Irish Agreement and contributed to his decision to retire from the House of Commons in 1987.

House of Lords
After the 1992 general election, John Major used a writ of acceleration to call Lord Cranborne up to the House of Lords in one of his father's junior titles. Thus, Lord Cranborne was summoned to Parliament as Baron Cecil, of Essendon in the County of Rutland (his father's most junior dignity), although he continued to be known by his courtesy style of Viscount Cranborne. This is the most recent time a writ of acceleration has been issued, and due to the provisions of the House of Lords Act 1999, abolishing the automatic right of hereditary peers to sit in the House of Lords, any future use of the writ of acceleration is highly unlikely.

He served for two years as a junior defence minister before being appointed as Lord Privy Seal and Leader of the House of Lords in 1994. Lord Cranborne was appointed by the Queen as Privy Counsellor (PC) on 21 July 1994. Funding for opposition parties in the House of Lords, known as Cranborne Money, began during his leadership. When Major resigned as Leader of the Conservative Party in an attempt to test his authority as leader in July 1995, Lord Cranborne led his re-election campaign. He was recognised as one of the few members of the Cabinet who were personally loyal to Major, but continued to lead the Conservative Peers after Labour won the 1997 general election.

When the new Prime Minister Tony Blair proposed the removal of the hereditary element in the House of Lords, Lord Cranborne negotiated a pact with the Labour government to retain a small number of hereditary peers (later set at 92) for what was intended to be an interim period. For the sake of form this amendment was formally proposed by Lord Weatherill, Convenor of the Cross-Bench Peers. However, Lord Cranborne gave his party's approval without consulting the party leader, William Hague, who knew nothing and was embarrassed when Blair told him of it in the House of Commons. Hague then sacked Lord Cranborne, who accepted his error, saying that he had "rushed in, like an ill-trained spaniel".

All former Leaders of the House of Lords who were hereditary peers accepted life peerages to keep them in the upper house in 1999. Lord Cranborne, who had received the title Baron Gascoyne-Cecil, of Essendon in the County of Rutland, remained active on the backbenches until the House of Lords adopted new rules for declaration of financial interests which he believed were too onerous. He took "Leave of Absence" on 1 November 2001. He was therefore out of the House of Lords when he succeeded his father as the 7th Marquess of Salisbury on 11 July 2003.

In January 2010, Lord Salisbury and Owen Paterson, the then Shadow Secretary of State for Northern Ireland, hosted secret talks at Hatfield House, involving the DUP, the UUP and the Conservative Party. These talks prompted speculation that the Conservatives were attempting to create a pan-unionist front to limit Sinn Féin and the Social Democratic and Labour Party at the general election of 2010.

In September 2012, Lord Salisbury, in his role as Chairman of the Thames Diamond Jubilee Foundation, was knighted by Queen Elizabeth II and became a Knight Commander of the Royal Victorian Order (KCVO).

He retired from the House of Lords on 8 June 2017, the date of the snap general election. He was appointed a Knight Companion of the Order of the Garter (KG) on 27 February 2019.

Other interests
Salisbury is a Deputy Lieutenant of Hertfordshire, and the current President of the Friends of the British Library and of the Friends of Friendless Churches.

Lord Salisbury is the Chairman of the Constitution Reform Group (CRG), a cross-party pressure group which seeks a new constitutional settlement in the UK by way of a new Act of Union. The group introduced the Act of Union Bill 2017-19 as a Private Member's Bill by Lord Lisvane in the House of Lords on 9 October 2018, when it received a formal first reading; its passage through Parliament was terminated by the ending of the parliamentary session in October 2019.

Lord Salisbury writes for The Spectator and the Centre for Policy Studies under the informal name of Robert Salisbury.  He is the Chairman of Reaction.

In 2020, Lord Salisbury published a book entitled William Simpson and the Crisis in Central Asia, 1884-5. It is a nonfiction book about the Victorian war artist William Simpson, and his involvement with the Afghan Boundary Commission, a surveying project which nearly triggered a war with Tsarist Russia in 1885. The book was privately published as a contribution to the Roxburghe Club, and it is illustrated by a set of sketches by Simpson now owned by Lord Salisbury.

Marriage and children
In 1970, aged 23, he married Hannah Stirling, niece of Colonel Sir David Stirling (a co-founder of the SAS) and a descendant of the Lords Lovat, Scottish Catholic aristocrats. The marriage was initially opposed by his family, chiefly because Stirling was a Catholic.

During the 1970s, Lord and Lady Cranborne had two sons and three daughters (including twins); the two elder daughters are now married. Until recently, they lived at Cranborne Manor, Dorset.  The family seat is Hatfield House, once home to Queen Elizabeth I of England, which was given to the family by James I of England in exchange for the Cecil family house Theobalds. The Cecils are landowners in Dorset, Hertfordshire and London, and the 7th Marquess ranked 352nd in the Sunday Times Rich List 2017, with an estimated net worth of £335m (of which the paintings at Hatfield accounted for £150m).

The Marquess of Salisbury's heir is his elder son Robert Edward "Ned" William Gascoyne-Cecil, Viscount Cranborne (born 1970). He was a page of honour to the Queen from 1983 to 1986. The heir is unmarried, though he does have a daughter born in 2001. The younger son, Lord James, has married and fathered one son, Thomas Richard James (born 2009).

Arms

References

External links
 
The young elite 1–10
Debrett's People of Today

|-

|-

|-

|-

|-

|-

|-

1946 births
Alumni of Christ Church, Oxford
British anti-communists
Robert, Salisbury 7
Conservative Party (UK) life peers
Gascoyne-Cecil, Robert
Deputy Lieutenants of Dorset
Deputy Lieutenants of Hertfordshire
Knights Commander of the Royal Victorian Order
Knights of the Garter
Leaders of the House of Lords
Living people
Lords Privy Seal
Robert
Members of the Privy Council of the United Kingdom
Chancellors of the University of Hertfordshire
People educated at Eton College
Gascoyne-Cecil, Robert
Gascoyne-Cecil, Robert
Salisbury, M7
Gascoyne-Cecil
Life peers created by Elizabeth II
Salisbury 7th